Ylva Lindberg (née Martinsen; born 29 June 1976) is a Swedish retired ice hockey player and, an assistant coach to the Norwegian women's national ice hockey team. She won a silver medal at the 2006 Winter Olympics and a bronze medal at the 2002 Winter Olympics.

Lindberg came out as lesbian in 2006, along with fellow hockey player Erika Holst.

References

External links

1976 births
Ice hockey players at the 1998 Winter Olympics
Ice hockey players at the 2002 Winter Olympics
Ice hockey players at the 2006 Winter Olympics
Lesbian sportswomen
LGBT ice hockey players
Swedish LGBT sportspeople
Living people
Medalists at the 2006 Winter Olympics
Medalists at the 2002 Winter Olympics
Olympic bronze medalists for Sweden
Olympic ice hockey players of Sweden
Olympic medalists in ice hockey
Olympic silver medalists for Sweden
Sportspeople from Umeå
Swedish women's ice hockey defencemen